Dagens Nyheter was a Norwegian newspaper, published in Harstad in Troms county.

Dagens Nyheter was started on 20 March 1924 as the Communist Party organ in the county—Troms Fylkes Kommunistblad had capsized a month earlier. Dagens Nyheter was first published twice a week, but this was cut to once from early 1925. The newspaper went defunct after its last issue on 7 March 1931.

The first editor was Sigurd Simensen.

References

1924 establishments in Norway
1931 disestablishments in Norway
Communist Party of Norway newspapers
Defunct newspapers published in Norway
Mass media in Harstad
Newspapers established in 1924
Norwegian-language newspapers
Publications disestablished in 1931